"Destination Moon" is a novella by science fiction author Robert A. Heinlein, first published in the September 1950 issue of Short Stories magazine; it is an adaptation of Heinlein's own screenplay for the 1950 feature film Destination Moon. It was  reprinted in the posthumous collection Requiem.

Plot
The story begins with Doctor Robert Corley, Rear Admiral "Red" Bowles, and Jim Barnes contemplating the success of their project to build a spaceship for flying to the Moon. Their craft is powered by a nuclear rocket engine, and the government has declined permission for it to be tested in place, suggesting a remote Pacific island facility instead. Corley, believing the delay is unreasonable and a simple delaying tactic, decides their spaceship is ready to go, just as soon as the next launch window arrives in a few hours; he rushes final flight preparation under the guise of a launch dress rehearsal.

At the last minute, a court order arrives at their desert base to prevent any lunar flight; the crew avoid having it served by slipping aboard their spaceship. They also avoid a further attempt to stop them by "test firing" the nuclear engine, flooding the launch pad with propulsion exhaust flame. The spaceship launches on time, although a major course correction along the way must be performed because of the fuel wasted for their engine's "test firing."

They photograph the lunar surface as they begin to land on the Moon, but more fuel is wasted when they try to avoid a large, deep canyon on their final landing approach. The spaceship lands out of direct line-of-sight of the Earth, so they are unable to report back via radio. The estimates of their remaining fuel supply indicates they lack enough fuel to return home safely. Admiral Bowles takes the view their safe return is irrelevant. All that matters now is that they claim the Moon in the name of the United States of America and make radio contact with Earth to report this fact. He suggests using their remaining fuel to make a brief flight into direct sight of Earth to report their claim, sacrificing themselves in the process for the greater good. The other crew members, however, prefer to try to return home, if at all possible.

Although Earth briefly rises above the horizon thanks to the Moon's libration, the Pacific Ocean is facing towards the lunar surface and so contact with North America cannot be established. The crew set themselves to lightening their spaceship as much as possible to improve their chances of returning home safely. During this process, they review their developed film and discover a small base has been established on the Moon. They wonder whether this base possibly might be Soviet or even alien in origin. Admiral Bowles immediately changes his previous position: they must now return to Earth and provide this important information to U. S. military intelligence. They proceed to further lighten their spaceship of all possible unnecessary weight and finally launch for home.

The story leaves the conclusion uncertain whether they will be able to make it back safely; Corley observes "probably not, but we're sure going to give it a try!"

See also
 Rocket Ship Galileo
Listen to Robert A. Heinlein's Destination Moon, Dimension X episode, originally broadcast on NBC radio in 1950 by clicking on the embedded link.

Short stories by Robert A. Heinlein
1950 short stories
Short stories set on the Moon
Works originally published in American magazines
Works originally published in pulp magazines